Sisters Lake is a lake in Alishan National Scenic Area, Alishan Township, Chiayi County, Taiwan.

Name
The lake is named Sisters because it was said there used to be two Taiwanese indigenous women of the Tsou tribe who committed suicide here because they could not find love.

History
The lake was dried out in 2002 due to prolonged draught season.

Geology
The lake is located at an altitude of 2,100 meters. The lake consists of two lakes, which are named Elder Sister Lake and Younger Sister Lake. Elder Sister Lake is the larger of the two lakes with a surface area of 530 m2. It has a shape of rectangular and it consists of two wooden pavilions built from Taxodium distichum. The Younger Sister Lake is the smaller of two with a surface area of 66 m2. Both lakes are separated by around 50 meters in distance.

Architecture
The two lakes is encircled by a 180 meter long foot path.

See also
 Geography of Taiwan
 List of lakes of Taiwan

References

Lakes of Taiwan
Landforms of Chiayi County
Tourist attractions in Chiayi County